The 2024 UEFA Champions League final will be the final match of the 2023–24 UEFA Champions League, the 69th season of Europe's premier club football tournament organised by UEFA, and the 32nd season since it was renamed from the European Champion Clubs' Cup to the UEFA Champions League. It will be played at Wembley Stadium in London, England, on 1 June 2024. Due to the postponement and relocation of the 2020 final, the final hosts were shifted back a year, with London instead hosting the 2024 final.

The winners will earn the right to play against the winners of the 2023–24 UEFA Europa League in the 2024 UEFA Super Cup.

Venue
This will be the third UEFA Champions League final to take place at the rebuilt Wembley Stadium, having previously been held in 2011 and 2013. Overall, it is the eighth final to be held in London, with the other five matches taking place at the original Wembley Stadium in 1963, 1968, 1971, 1978, and 1992. The match will be the ninth European Cup final held in England, with the 2003 final having been held at Old Trafford in Manchester, equalling the record of nine European Cup finals held in Italy, Germany and Spain. It is also the thirteenth held in the United Kingdom, with the 1960, 1976 and 2002 finals held in Scotland and the 2017 final held in Wales. Wembley Stadium was also a host venue at UEFA Euro 2020, with eight matches played at the stadium including the semi-finals and final.

Host selection
An open bidding process was launched on 22 February 2019 by UEFA to select the 2022 and 2023 UEFA Champions League final venues. Associations had until 22 March 2019 to express interest, and bid dossiers had to be submitted by 1 July 2019.

The Football Association was reported to have bid with Wembley Stadium in London to host the 2023 final, in order to mark the centenary of the opening of the original stadium in 1923. Wembley Stadium was selected by the UEFA Executive Committee during their meeting in Ljubljana, Slovenia on 24 September 2019, where the hosts for the 2021 and 2022 UEFA Champions League finals were also appointed.

On 17 June 2020, the UEFA Executive Committee announced that due to the postponement and relocation of the 2020 final, London would instead host the 2024 final.

Match

Details
The "home" team (for administrative purposes) will be determined by an additional draw held after the quarter-final and semi-final draws.

See also
2024 UEFA Europa League final
2024 UEFA Europa Conference League final
2024 UEFA Women's Champions League final

Notes

References

External links

2024
Final
Scheduled association football competitions
June 2024 sports events in Europe
International club association football competitions hosted by London
International club association football competitions hosted by England
2020s in London

2024 in sports